ECFC may refer to one of the following football clubs:

 Exeter City F.C.
 Elgin City F.C.
 Edinburgh City F.C.
 Edinburgh City F.C. (1928)
 East Craigie F.C.
 Ethiopian Coffee FC

ECFC could also refer to the:
 Eastern Collegiate Football Conference
 Enlisted Career Force Controls